Qipengyuania oceanensis is a Gram-negative, ovoid-rod shaped and strictly aerobic bacterium from the genus Qipengyuania which has been isolated from deep-sea sediments from the Western Pacific Ocean.

References 

Sphingomonadales
Bacteria described in 2015